The Travancore tortoise (Indotestudo travancorica) is a large forest tortoise growing up to  in length. The species was first described by George Albert Boulenger in 1907. It primarily feeds on grasses and herbs. It also feeds on molluscs, insects, animal carcass, fungi and fruits. It occurs in hill forests at 450–850 m elevation. Males combat by ramming their shell during their breeding season between November and March. It makes a shallow nest in the ground and lay 1 to 5 eggs. Hatchlings are 55–60 mm in size. The tortoise is hunted and it is threatened due to forest fires, habitat destruction and fragmentation.

Identification: a scute right behind the head is absent and the second scute along the vertebral column is located at the highest point of the shell.
Status: IUCN Red list - vulnerable; Indian Wildlife (Protection) Act: Schedule IV.
Distribution: restricted to the Western Ghats, in the Indian states of Kerala, Karnataka and Tamil Nadu.
Vernacular names:
Tamil: periya amai, kal amai
Kadas: vengala amai
Kannada: betta aame, gudde aame, kadu aame
Malayalam: kattu aama

References

External links

Indotestudo
Reptiles of India
Reptiles described in 1907
Taxa named by George Albert Boulenger
Endemic fauna of the Western Ghats